The 2018 Mountain West Conference Championship Game was played on Saturday, December 1, 2018, at Albertsons Stadium in Boise, Idaho, to determine the 2018 football champion of the Mountain West Conference (MW). For the second consecutive year, the game featured the West Division champion Fresno State Bulldogs visiting the Mountain Division champion Boise State Broncos. The game was broadcast nationally by ESPN for the fourth consecutive year.

Both Boise State and Fresno State finished the conference season with a 7–1 record. Boise State earned the right to host the championship due to their win over Fresno State on November 9 in Boise. After also meeting twice during the 2017 season, this was the fourth time the two teams met in a span of 372 days.

The 2018 championship game was the sixth edition of the event. In the 2017 championship game, Boise State defeated Fresno State 17–14. The two schools also met in the 2014 game.

In a low-scoring game on a snow-covered field, the teams played to a 13–13 tie through regulation. In overtime, Boise State was held to a field goal, while Fresno State scored a touchdown to win, 19–16.

Teams

Fresno State

The Bulldogs finished the season 10–2 overall record, with a 7–1 conference record to be champions of the West Division. Their only conference loss came to Boise State. Fresno State enters the game ranked No. 25 in the College Football Playoff rankings and AP poll.

Boise State

Boise State finished with a 10–2 overall record, with a 7–1 conference record, with their only conference loss coming to San Diego State. The Broncos tied Utah State for first place in the Mountain Division. However, the Broncos won the head-to-head meeting to be crowned Mountain Division champions as the Mountain West does not recognize co-champions in a two-way tie. Boise State enters the game ranked No. 22 in the College Football Playoff rankings, No. 19 in the AP poll, and No. 20 in the Coaches poll.

Game summary

Scoring summary

Statistics

References

2018 Mountain West Conference football season
Mountain West Conference Football Championship Game
Boise State Broncos football games
Fresno State Bulldogs football games
December 2018 sports events in the United States
Mountain West